Top Gear or Zhuigaodang is a 2011 Chinese Hunan TV TV series adopting the format as made popular in the 2002 Top Gear reboot, Zhuigaodang best translates into "Highest Gear". The attempt is noted as being a toned down version of its British counterpart, and usually ran about 30 minutes in length.

History

In February 2011, rumors started circulating that the Chinese TV station, CCTV, was looking to adapt the Top Gear format for the local market. The following week, it was confirmed that not only were they looking to adapt, but had in fact already finished a pilot, by host Cao Yunjin. Cao Yunjin went on to reveal that the pilot episode included a race between a Cadillac and a donkey to see which would be better suited and more efficient as farming equipment, he continued that they would not be able to emulate many of that which had made the original famous, but that they would still be doing "fun" stuff. After almost a month of no further development, the first fifteen minutes of the pilot was uploaded to YouTube, but was swiftly taken down by BBC Worldwide. While it was largely reported to have been made for CCTV, the eventual series premiered on Hunan TV on the 23rd of April 2011, and featured Huang Zheng, Cao Yunjin, and Li Rui as hosts, and also featured a local version of The Stig.

Episodes

References

Top Gear
Chinese television series based on British television series
2011 Chinese television series debuts
2011 Chinese television series endings